Alexandru "Alec" Năstac (born 2 April 1949) is a retired middleweight boxer from Romania. He competed at the 1972 and 1976 Olympics and won a bronze medal in 1976. He also won silver medals at the 1971 and 1973 European championships and 1974 World Championships.

Năstac took up boxing in 1967 at Constructorul Galați, coached by Grigore Jelesneac and Petre Mihai. While serving with the Romanian Army he moved to Steaua București, where he stayed for the rest of his career, first as competitor and after 1978 as coach. In the 1980s he also played minor roles in a few Romanian films including The Ring.

1972 Olympic results
Below is the record of Alec Năstac, a Romanian middleweight boxer who competed at the 1972 Munich Olympics:

 Round of 32: lost to Alejandro Montoya (Cuba) by first-round knockout

References

External links 

 
 
 

1949 births
Living people
Middleweight boxers
Boxers at the 1972 Summer Olympics
Boxers at the 1976 Summer Olympics
Olympic boxers of Romania
Olympic bronze medalists for Romania
Olympic medalists in boxing
Medalists at the 1976 Summer Olympics
Romanian male boxers
AIBA World Boxing Championships medalists
People from Galați County